Grosvenor Atterbury (July 7, 1869 in Detroit, MI – October 18, 1956 in Southampton, NY) was an American architect, urban planner and writer. He studied at Yale University, where he was an editor of campus humor magazine The Yale Record After travelling in Europe, he studied architecture at Columbia University and worked in the offices of McKim, Mead & White.

Much of Atterbury's early work consisted of weekend houses for wealthy industrialists. Atterbury was given the commission for the model housing community of Forest Hills Gardens which began in 1909 under the sponsorship of the Russell Sage Foundation.

For Forest Hills, Atterbury developed an innovative construction method: each house was built from approximately 170 standardized precast concrete panels, fabricated off-site and assembled by crane. The system was sophisticated even by modern standards: panels were cast with integral hollow insulation chambers; casting formwork incorporated an internal sleeve, allowing molds to be "broken" before concrete had completely set; and panels were moved to the site in only two operations (formwork to truck and truck to crane).

Atterbury's system influenced the work of mid-1920s European modern architects like Ernst May, who used panelized prefab concrete systems in a number of celebrated experimental housing projects in Frankfurt. In this way Atterbury can be considered a progenitor of the Modern Movement.

Atterbury was elected to the National Academy of Design in 1918 as an Associate member, and became a full member in 1940.

Atterbury worked on various projects with John D. Rockefeller, Jr., in the 1930s, including what today is Stone Barns Food and Agriculture Center, and the Gatehouse and Entrance Wall to Kykuit Estate, as well as the six stucco houses built for estate employees.  The six houses were designed as the core of Pocantico Village that Rockefeller was building as Kykuit was being completed, and to complement the style of the Union Church and Pocantico Hills Central School, which he had completed.

Works

 Stone Barns Center for Food and Agriculture, Pocantico Hills, New York, 1930-33 
 Six cottages commissioned by John D. Rockefeller, Jr., for estate employees, Kykuit, Pocantico Hills, New York, 1930-33 
 Kykuit Gate House and Entrance Wall, and Administrative Building, Pocantico Hills, New York, 1930
 Connecticut Hall restoration, New Haven, Connecticut, 1905
 Renaissance Pittsburgh Hotel (formerly Fulton Building), Pittsburgh, Pennsylvania, 1906
 Tenney Memorial Chapel, Walnut Grove Cemetery, Methuen, Massachusetts, 1906
 The Boulders, 99 Shore Ave. Greenwood Lake, New York, 1911
 The Church-in-the-Gardens, New York City, 1915
 Surprise Valley Farm, Newport, Rhode Island, 1914-1916
 Industrial village (the pottery houses) for Holston Corporation, 1915-1916
 House of the Redeemer, New York City, 1916
 Wereholme, Islip, New York, 1917
 Carriage Paths, Bridges and Gatehouses, Acadia National Park and vicinity Acadia National Park, Maine, 1919
 Aldus Chapin Higgins House, Worcester, Massachusetts, 1921
 Sage House (formerly Russell Sage Foundation Building), New York City, 1922 to 1926
 Holy Trinity Rectory, a four-storey brick rectory at 341 East 87th Street, Manhattan, 1927 (for $50,000).
 Pond Mansion, Tucson, Arizona, 1930
 Rockefeller Hall, Winter Harbor, Maine, 1933, commissioned by John D. Rockefeller, Jr. and built by the National Park Service to house Navy personnel in the French Norman Revival-style.
 Children's Village of the Hartford Orphan Asylum, 1680 Albany Ave. Hartford, Connecticut
 Shore Road Historic District, Shore Rd. Cold Spring Harbor, New York

See also 
 Atterbury Hill, Southampton.

References

External links
 Grosvenor Atterbury papers and photographs, circa 1900-1994. Held by the Department of Drawings & Archives, Avery Architectural & Fine Arts Library, Columbia University.
 Designing for High and Low, by Christopher Gray, Oct. 22, 2009, New York Times, www.nytimes.com/2009/10/25/realestate/25scapes.html

1869 births
1956 deaths
Columbia Graduate School of Architecture, Planning and Preservation alumni
Architects from Detroit
Artists from Detroit
American ecclesiastical architects
Yale University alumni
Russell Sage Foundation